Epirranthis is a genus of moths in the family Geometridae erected by Jacob Hübner in 1823.

Species
 Epirranthis diversata (Denis & Schiffermüller, 1775)
 Epirranthis substriataria (Hulst, 1896)

References

Oenochrominae